The Frankish towers of Greece are the towers built during the period of Frankish rule in Greece (ca. 1204 – 1500), either for defence or for habitation, by the Frankish Crusaders, of which many survive to this day.

 Frankish Tower (Acropolis of Athens) on the Acropolis of Athens, demolished in 1874
 Frankish Tower at Agia Marina, Boeotia, vanished since the 19th century
 Frankish Tower (Aliartos) in Aliartos, Boeotia
 Frankish Tower (Amfikleia) in Amfikleia, Phthiotis
 Frankish Tower (Ano Tithorea) in Ano Tithorea, Phthiotis
 Frankish Tower at Antikyra, Boeotia, demolished in the 1960s
 Frankish Tower (Askri) in Askri, Boeotia
 Frankish Tower (Avlonari) in Avlonari, Euboea
 Frankish Tower (Chalandritsa) in Chalandritsa, Achaea
 Frankish Tower (Davleia) in Davleia, Boeotia
 Frankish Tower at Gla, Boeotia, vanished since the 19th century
 Frankish Tower (Harma) in Harma, Boeotia
 Frankish Tower (Kirra) in Kirra, Phocis
 Frankish Tower (Koroneia) in Koroneia, Boeotia
 Frankish Tower (Liada) in Markopoulo, Attica
 Frankish Tower (Lilaia) in Lilaia, Phocis
 Frankish Tower (Livadostro) in Livadostro, Boeotia
 Frankish Tower (Melissochori) in Melissochori, Boeotia
 Frankish Tower of Oinoi in Marathonas, Attica
 Frankish Tower (Panakton) in Panakton, Boeotia
 Frankish Tower (Paralimni) in Paralimni, Boeotia
 Frankish Tower (Parorion) in Parorion, Boeotia
 Frankish Tower (Polydrosos) in Polydrosos, Phocis
 Frankish Tower (Pyrgos) in Pyrgos, Boeotia
 Frankish Tower at Inofyta, Boeotia, demolished during World War II
 Frankish Tower (Tanagra) in Tanagra, Boeotia
 Frankish Tower (Tatitza) in Tatitza, Boeotia
 Frankish Tower (Thisvi) in Thisvi, Boeotia
 Frankish Tower (Thourio) in Thourio, Boeotia
 Frankish Tower (Varnavas) in Varnavas, Attica
 Frankish Tower (Vravrona) in Vravrona, Attica
 Frankish Tower at Yliki, Boeotia, vanished under the waters of the Yliki reservoir
 Frankish Tower (Ypsilantis) in Ypsilantis, Boeotia

Sources
 
 

Frankish towers
Fortifications in Greece
Frankokratia
Medieval sites in Greece
Medieval defences
Frankish towers